This list of tallest buildings in different cities in India enumerates the tallest buildings of every big city in India based on official height, This includes spires and architectural details but does not include antenna masts. There are currently more than 200 skyscrapers in India and most of them are in Mumbai, New Delhi (with the NCR; Gurgaon and Noida) and Kolkata. The era of skyscrapers in India began with the completion of the LIC Building in Chennai in 1959. With 12 floors initially, it was the first high-rise building building in the country. Currently, Palais Royale, located in Mumbai is the tallest under construction (topped out) skyscraper in the country, with a height of 320 metres (1,050 ft) with 88 floors.

Ahmedabad
 List of tallest buildings in Ahmedabad

Bengaluru (Bangalore)
 List of tallest buildings in Bangalore

Chennai
 List of tallest buildings in Chennai

New Delhi
 List of tallest buildings in Delhi

Gurgaon (Gurugram) 

 List of tallest buildings in Gurgaon

Hyderabad 
 List of tallest buildings in Hyderabad

Kochi (Cochin)
 List of tallest buildings in Kochi

Kolkata
 List of tallest buildings in Kolkata

Lucknow
 List of tallest buildings in Lucknow

Mangalore
 List of tallest buildings in Mangalore

Mumbai
 List of tallest buildings in Mumbai

Navi Mumbai
 List of tallest buildings in Navi Mumbai

Panvel
 List of tallest buildings in Panvel

Pune
 List of tallest buildings in Pune

Thrissur
 List of tallest buildings in Thrissur

Thiruvananthapuram
 List of tallest buildings in Trivandrum

Visakhapatnam
 List of tallest buildings in Visakhapatnam

References